Klagshamn is a neighbourhood of Malmö, situated in the Borough of Limhamn-Bunkeflo, Malmö Municipality, Skåne County, Sweden.

Sports
The following sports clubs are located in Klagshamn:
 IFK Klagshamn

References

Neighbourhoods of Malmö